Forestdale School may refer to

Maine 
 Forestdale School (Maine), an SDA school in Woodstock, Maine

Massachusetts 
 Forestdale School (Massachusetts), a school in Sandwich, Massachusetts 
 Forestdale School (Malden, Massachusetts), a school in Malden, Massachusetts.